Lester Mendez is a multi-platinum, Grammy award-winning record producer, songwriter and composer. His production/writing credits include a multitude of successful hits with Shakira, Jewel, Nelly Furtado, Jessica Simpson, Enrique Iglesias, and others.

Career
Starting out professionally as a session musician and programmer, he worked on a variety of music and genres, including Hip hop, Miami bass, Freestyle music, House music / Deep house, World music, Pop music and Latin pop. Mendez's keyboard, programming, arranging, and remixing credits include artists such as: Jimmy Page, David Coverdale, David Byrne, Spice Girls, Pet Shop Boys, Grace Jones, PM Dawn, Bee Gees, Jennifer Lopez, Ricky Martin, Babyface, Martika, Chris de Burgh, Johnny Mathis, Will Smith, Collective Soul, Angélique Kidjo, Byron Stingily, Exposé, Paris by Air, Gloria Estefan, Chynna Phillips, Regina Belle, Gerald Alston, Phyllis Hyman, Jaydee, Haddaway, Deep Forest, Lonnie Gordon, Cerrone, Jimmy "Bo" Horne, Murk (band), Funky Green Dogs, Qkumba Zoo, Wubble-U, Nuclear Valdez, Afro-Rican, Lulu, the seminal freestyle band Will To Power (band), and many others.

His early production / songwriting career saw him working with Chris Blackwell's Island Records artists Grace Jones, Angélique Kidjo, Baaba Maal, Dominican-born rapper , and others.

As his career continued to grow as a producer & songwriter, he went on to work with a number of artists, including: Carlos Santana, Jason Mraz, Josh Groban, Dido, Sia, Nelly Furtado, Shakira, Seal, Donna Summer, Anastacia, Ricky Martin, Enrique Iglesias, Sean Paul, Jem, Kerli, Oh land, Ladyhawke, Mike Posner, Sam Sparro, Mr Little Jeans, Adam Lambert, PlayRadioPlay!, Tarkan, Markus Feehily, Skylar Stecker, Rittz, She Is We and others. Most recently, he founded a project called Gemini Rising, in which he writes and produces all the music. Fellow collaborators on the project are Fiora (musician) and Tensnake. He also produced and co-wrote all 10 songs on the debut album by Claude Fontaine, a project he co-developed and co-conceived with Claude. The album was released on Innovative Leisure Records in the spring of 2019.

Awards

Discography (select)

References

External links
EMI Music Publishing

American record producers
Grammy Award winners
Latin Grammy Award winners
American male writers
Living people
Year of birth missing (living people)
Place of birth missing (living people)
American people of Colombian descent